The Journal of Hospital Infection is a peer-reviewed medical journal published by Elsevier on behalf of the Healthcare Infection Society. The journal publishes articles describing original research on epidemiology, healthcare, and antimicrobial resistance.

According to the 2018 Journal Citation Reports, the journal has a 2017 impact factor of 3.354. The journal was established in 1980 and the editor-in-chief is J. Gray.

References

External links

Microbiology journals
Publications established in 1980
Monthly journals
English-language journals
Elsevier academic journals